This is a list of all of the armoured units formed by the Australian Army

Historic units

Pre-World War II
 1st Tank Section (Australia)
 1st Light Tank Company (Australia)
 2nd Light Tank Company (Australia)
 1st Light Car Patrol (Australia)
 1st Armoured Car Regiment (Australia)
 2nd Armoured Car Regiment (Australia)

World War II

Divisions
 1st Armoured Division (Australia)
 2nd Armoured Division (Australia)
 3rd Armoured Division (Australia)

Brigades
 1st Armoured Brigade (Australia)
 2nd Armoured Brigade (Australia)
 3rd Army Tank Brigade (Australia)
 4th Armoured Brigade (Australia)
 6th Armoured Brigade (Australia)

Armoured reconnaissance regiments
 6th Armoured Car Regiment (Australia)
 2/11th Armoured Car Regiment (Australia)
 12th Armoured Car Regiment (Australia)
 6th Division Cavalry Regiment (Australia)
 7th Division Cavalry Regiment (Australia)
 9th Division Cavalry Regiment (Australia)
 Australian 2nd Cavalry Regiment
 8th Cavalry Regiment (Australia)
 21st Cavalry Regiment (Australia)
 25th Cavalry Regiment (Australia)

Armoured regiments and tank battalions
 2/4th Armoured Regiment (Australia)
 2/5th Armoured Regiment (Australia)
 2/6th Armoured Regiment (Australia)
 2/7th Armoured Regiment (Australia)
 2/8th Armoured Regiment (Australia)
 2/9th Armoured Regiment (Australia)
 2/10th Armoured Regiment (Australia)
 12th Armoured Regiment (Australia)
 13th Armoured Regiment (Australia)
 14th Armoured Regiment (Australia)
 1st Army Tank Battalion (Australia)
 2nd Army Tank Battalion (Australia)
 3rd Army Tank Battalion (Australia)

Independent squadrons
 2/1st Light Tank Squadron (Australia)
 2/2nd Light Tank Squadron (Australia)
 3rd Armoured Brigade Reconnaissance Squadron (Australia)
 2/1st Reconnaissance Squadron (Australia)
 2/1st Amphibious Armoured Squadron (Australia)

Jungle division carrier companies
 3rd Division Carrier Company
 5th Division Carrier Company
 6th Division Carrier Company
 7th Division Carrier Company
 9th Division Carrier Company
 11th Division Carrier Company

Post-World War II

Australian Regular Army units
 1st Armoured Car Squadron (Australia)
 3rd Cavalry Regiment (Australia)
 4th Cavalry Regiment (Australia)
 1st Armoured Personnel Carrier Squadron (Australia)
 Medium Tank Trials Unit (Australia)
 School of Armour (Australia)

Citizen Military Forces/Army Reserve units
 1st Armoured Brigade (Australia)
 2nd Armoured Brigade (Australia)
 1st Royal New South Wales Lancers
 7th/21st Reconnaissance Regiment (Australian Horse)
 8th/13th Victorian Mounted Rifles
 6th New South Wales Mounted Rifles
 15th Northern River Lancers

Current units

Australian Regular Army 

 1st Armoured Regiment
 2nd Cavalry Regiment
 3rd/4th Cavalry Regiment (Australia)
 2nd/14th Light Horse Regiment (Queensland Mounted Infantry)

Army Reserve 

 1st/15th Royal New South Wales Lancers
 3rd/9th Light Horse (South Australian Mounted Rifles)
 4th/19th Prince of Wales's Light Horse
 10th Light Horse Regiment
 12th/16th Hunter River Lancers

References 

Armoured